Glen A. Froseth (born January 24, 1934) is an American politician in the state of North Dakota. He is a member of the North Dakota House of Representatives, representing the 4th district. A Republican, he was first elected in 1992. He is an alumnus of the North Dakota State College of Science and former newspaper publisher. Devlin is a former  president of the North Dakota Newspaper Association.

References

1934 births
Living people
American newspaper publishers (people)
Journalists from North Dakota
Republican Party members of the North Dakota House of Representatives
People from Glendive, Montana
People from Ward County, North Dakota
American male journalists
21st-century American politicians